Atmaprajnananda Saraswati (born 1955) is a published author of books on the Vedas, Upanishads and Sanskrit. She is a traditional Dashanami Sannyasini of Acharya Sankara-Bhagavatpada Order. After a gurukula study of around 12 years, she took sannyasa in March 2008 from her spiritual guru Swami Dayananda Saraswati(Arsha Vidya).

Education
Atmaprajnananda Saraswati<ref>{{cite news|last1=Friday Edition, Speaking Tree (February 15, 2020)|title=THE MAVERICK MONK ' Editorial by NARAYANI GANESH|url=https://www.speakingtree.in/article/the-maverick-monk|language= en|publisher=speakingtree.in|access-date= 15 February 2020 }}</ref> is a first class science graduate (1975) from Sri Venkateswara University. She is an MBA from XIMB, Bhubaneswar (1988–91), M.A (Sanskrit) and Ph.D. (Sanskrit) from Utkal University (2012).

Books authored
	Dasasanti, 2008
       Rupasiddhi,  2008
	Nomenclature of the Vedas.2012 D.K. PrintWorld(P) Ltd. New Delhi. pp. xxvi, 234 p. .
	Rsikas of the Rgveda. 2013 D.K. PrintWorld(P) Ltd. New Delhi. pp. xvi, 151p. .
	Om: the Sound Symbol, 2014, Munshiram Manoharlal, Delhi,  .
	Vision of Advaita Vedanta in Taittiriya Upanishad With Special Reference to Shankarabhashya'', 2016, D.K. PrintWorld (P) Ltd. New Delhi,  .

 Discography - Chanting (Vedic and non-Vedic) 
Vedic Chants
Sri Rudram
Kathopanishad
Mundakopanishad
Taittiriya Upanishad
Srimad Bhagavadgita
Sri Vishnusahasranama
Sri Lalitasahasranama
Saundaryalahari
Stotra Chants

Award and recognition

Bollywood Actor Jackie Shroff handing over "Vedanta Shiromani" Title to Swamini Atmaprajnananda Saraswati. (right)
 In January 2017, she was awarded with "Vedanta Shiromani'''" Title by Times Internet Ltd for her contribution in the domain of Vedanta(Upanishada). The award was handed over by Mr. Jackie Shroff.

Jaipur Literature Festival, Jan 2018 along with Philip Lutgendorf, Arundhathi Subramaniam.
Atmaprajnananda was a speaker in the JLF 2018. In her session moderated by Philip A. Lutgendorf, she Introduced her book "Rshikas of the Rgveda" in which twenty-seven women poets had their work represented. She also clarified that - “Vedas are the sourcebook for all discipline".

References 

1955 births
Living people
Indian writers
Sanskrit writers